Kamchay Mear (meaning "to chase away/disperse Mara") is a district located in Prey Veng Province, in south eastern Cambodia.

References 

Districts of Prey Veng province